The Atwood–Higgins Historic District encompasses a historic property with deep colonial roots in Cape Cod National Seashore.  Located on Bound Brook Island on the west side of Wellfleet, Massachusetts, the centerpiece of the district is the Thomas Atwood House, built c. 1730.  The property is emblematic of Cape Cod's colonial origins and its later transformation into a summer resort area.  The house was listed on the National Register of Historic Places in 1976; the district was listed in 2010.  The property is open for guided tours by the National Park Service on a seasonal basis.

Description and history
The Atwood–Higgins property is located on the east side of Bound Brook Island, which is located in northwestern Wellfleet on the lower portion of Cape Cod. The centerpiece of the property is a typical -story Cape house, whose oldest portion, a "half house" three bays wide, was built in 1730 by Thomas Higgins, a distant ancestor of George Higgins. This property was owned by Higgins descendants until 1805, when it was purchased by Thomas Atwood, Sr.  The last full-time resident of the house was Atwood's son Thomas, Jr. who died in 1873. After sitting vacant for many years, the house was acquired in 1919 by George Higgins and the house was given a painstaking restoration. Higgins originally claimed the house to date to the 17th century; this is not supported by the architecture or documentary record.

George Higgins, in addition to restoring the house, built a variety of outbuildings, giving the property a rustic rural feel.  The buildings he built include a barn, wellhouse, guest house, and country store, all essentially in a Colonial Revival interpretation of a colonial Cape Cod farmstead.  This job was made easier when the town built an improved Bound Brook Island Road, connecting the island to the mainland.  Higgins and his neighbors on the island made an agreement to limit development on the island to historically compatible alterations and improvements.  Higgins gave the property to the National Park Service when the Cape Cod National Seashore was created in 1961.

The house was listed on the National Register of Historic Places in 1976.  In 2010, the listing was greatly expanded to include the 20th-century buildings and to recognize the work of George Higgins.  The house is seasonally open to tours offered by the Park Service.

See also
List of the oldest buildings in Massachusetts
National Register of Historic Places listings in Barnstable County, Massachusetts
National Register of Historic Places listings in Cape Cod National Seashore

References

External links

National Register of Historic Places in Cape Cod National Seashore
Houses completed in 1730
Houses in Barnstable County, Massachusetts
Wellfleet, Massachusetts
Historic districts on the National Register of Historic Places in Massachusetts
Houses on the National Register of Historic Places in Barnstable County, Massachusetts
1730 establishments in Massachusetts